Anthony Hill (born 12 February 1973) is a former Australian professional rugby union player. He was a journeyman in France's rugby Top 14 and played for several clubs including RC Narbonne, Pau and Béziers. From 2008-10 he was general manager for Rugby Nice Côte d'Azur Université-Racing, moving in May 2010 to Stade Français, in charge of the club's recruitment.

References 

1973 births
Australian rugby union players
French rugby union players
Living people
Rugby union flankers